B. Donald "Bud" Grant (February 7, 1932 – July 1, 2011) was an American television executive. He originally started his career at NBC in 1956, and stayed there until 1972, when he joined CBS, and known for resurrecting game shows on the daytime lineup after a four-year absence since 1968, such as The Price is Right. He served as the President of CBS Entertainment from 1980 until 1987. He was credited with spearheading 1980s CBS shows such as Newhart and Murder, She Wrote.

Grant was born in Baltimore, Maryland, and earned a Bachelor of Science in business from Johns Hopkins University. He served from 1953 to 1955 in the U.S. Coast Guard.

Grant left CBS in 1987 and founded his own production company, Bud Grant Productions, with an exclusive deal with CBS. He would later form Grant/Tribune Prods., which produced for Tribune Broadcasting and Walt Disney Studios.

Grant died in Newport Beach, California, on July 1, 2011.

References

External links
 
 https://www.nytimes.com/1987/10/31/arts/cbs-entertainment-chief-is-leaving-the-network.html
 http://www.beverlyhillscc.com/Default.aspx?p=DynamicModule&pageid=258840&ssid=120698&vnf=1
 http://www.emmys.com/shows/i-love-lucy-very-first-show

1934 births
2011 deaths
CBS executives
Presidents of CBS Entertainment
American television executives
American television producers
Johns Hopkins University alumni